The fifth season of Canadian Idol is the fifth installation of the Idol series in Canada. It was again hosted by Ben Mulroney, with Farley Flex, Jake Gold, Sass Jordan and Zack Werner all returning as judges. The show premiered on June 5, 2007, with a 90-minute episode. Voting began during the fourth week. New events introduced that season included the Help Idols build a house and the Kraft Confidential with David Kerr. The elimination song for this year was Walk on Home by Kalan Porter. The final episode of the season was broadcast on September 11, 2007, when Brian Melo was crowned Canadian Idol.

Plan
On December 19, 2006, CTV announced their plans for the fifth season of Canadian Idol. It started off in Vancouver on February 3, 2007, and went on to 9 more cities across Canada in a 10-week period.

Auditions
This was the first season in which Canadian auditioners could play along with their instrument in their audition, making it the second Idol program to do so, after the 2006 season of Australian Idol. The auditioners were allowed to bring any type of instrument they wish as long as they are able to sing and play at the same time. They must be able to carry their instrument with them throughout the audition process. CTV explained on its website that many competitors have indicated they feel more comfortable in an audition setting by accompanying themselves on an instrument. Competitors were judged on a whole range of factors, including singing ability, style and presence. They state that the "Ability to play an instrument is yet another dimension to each competitor's complete package."

Auditions were held in eleven cities in the winter and early spring of 2007 in the following order:
 February 3 & 4: Vancouver BC Place Stadium
 February 10 & 11: Calgary Pengrowth Saddledome
 February 17 & 18: Saskatoon Credit Union Centre
 February 24 & 25: Winnipeg MTS Centre
 March 3 & 4: London John Labatt Centre
 March 10 & 11: Montreal Pepsi Forum
 March 17 & 18: Ottawa St-Laurent Centre
 March 24 & 25: Halifax Halifax Metro Centre
 April 4: St. John's Mile One Centre
 Starting April 11: Toronto Yonge-Dundas Square

The registration started promptly after 8 am CTV committed that all auditioners who showed up between 8 am – 4 p.m. would be seen. In bigger cities however, the line may have been cut off before four, with the auditioners being asked to come back the next day.

Audition process
The audition process may vary in different cities. However, the concept is essentially the same.

Tier 1
After the competitor receives their number at the registration desk, they are allowed to go to other places until their number is called. After their number is called, they will be asked to wait in the front line for their audition for the first round. Auditioners will be sent in groups of five, taken to the waiting room by an audition crew. The audition crews responsible for the groups will take the competitors to Tier 1, where they will audition to the representative of a producer with their group.

Each auditioner will take turn to sing one song for as long as they want. If the representative is not sure about the competitor's performance, they may ask them to sing another song. After all five auditioners have sung, the representatives may make comments, and announces auditioners that will not go through to the second round. The successful auditioners will be given a Yellow Ticket, and will return to the waiting room to wait for an audition crew to lead them to a separate waiting room where they wait for the second round of audition.

Tier 2
After the auditioner's number is called for the second round of audition known as Tier 2, an audition crew will take them along with couple others to the waiting room once more. The competitors will have to wait there until their number is called, and then they will be sent into the audition room. In Tier 2, the competitors will audition to a producer of the show, where they will be asked to sing a minimum of two songs. The successful auditioner will receive a Blue Ticket, and will need to return to the registration desk to register for the Celebrity Judges round.

Celebrity judges
By assigned order of time on successful auditioner's registration paper, they will be called into the final round of audition where they meet the Canadian Idol Celebrity Judges Farley Flex, Jake Gold, Sass Jordan and Zack Werner. It will be held at a secret location on another day.

In this round, the auditioner will have to prepare one song in the song list that is given to you when you are registering for the third round, along with four other songs of your own choice. Successful auditioners will be given a Gold Ticket, where they will have a chance to participate in the Top 200 week in Toronto.

The Gold Ticket receivers are asked to remain absolutely silent, or they may face possible disqualification due to fairness purposes.

Top 212
The Top 212 auditions were again held in Toronto. The 212 singers from across the country selected stepped in front of the four judges during the Top 200 week. They competed against cuts that included solos, duets and group performances. Eventually, the group as whittled down to just 22 finalists.

Top 22, The Semi-Finals
The Top 22 was announced on June 19. One original member of the Top 22, Ritchea Hodge, dropped out for personal reasons and was replaced by Scarlett Burke.

Those who were eliminated before the finals are listed below.

Males Eliminated
Liam Styles Chang, 27, is a singer/songwriter from Victoria, British Columbia. Liam is currently the lead singer of the band Aivia.
Tyler Mullendore, 19, is a construction worker from Lake Ainslie, Nova Scotia. He is notable for making the judges laugh during his audition, when after being asked if he had ever seen the show, he retorted, "Yeah, I seen 'er, buddy."
Andrew Austin, 27, is a musician from Sarnia, Ontario.
Clifton Murray, 18, is a singer and actor from Toronto, Ontario.
Derek Hoffman, 17, is a student from Aurora, Ontario. Derek is currently the lead singer of the pop/rock band Brighter Brightest.
Justyn Wesley, 22, is a singer/songwriter and producer from Toronto, Ontario.

Females Eliminated
Montana Martin Iles, 16, is a student from Sainte-Julienne, Quebec. Despite performing alone during the group part of Toronto Week, she impressed the judges with her raw style.
Annika Odegard, 16, is a student and performer from Calgary, Alberta
Naomi-Joy Blackhall, 25, is an account manager from Halifax, Nova Scotia. She and her fellow Top 22 member Dwight d'Eon have been labelled as the rockers for this season.
Scarlett Burke, 18, is a performer from Toronto, Ontario who joined the competition after Ritchea Hodge dropped out for personal reasons. Prior to the show, Burke had played Nala in The Lion King at the Princess of Wales Theatre in Toronto.
Maud Coussa-Jandl, 25, is a Promotions Coordinator from Sherbrooke, Quebec.
Christine Hanlon, 21, is a singer/songwriter from Toronto, Ontario. She was shown in the fourth episode as continuing in the competition despite a throat infection.

Withdrew

Ritchea Hodge is a 16-year-old High School Student from Brampton, Ontario. Hodge dropped out of the competition for unrevealed, personal reasons prior to June 27.

Top 22

Men

Women

Top 18

Men

Women

Top 14

Men

Women

Top 10, The Finals
After the Semi-Finals, the final 10 competitors are faced with a new theme challenge every week. Based on public voting, one finalist is eliminated each week. The season finale of Canadian Idol took place on September 11, 2007. Brian Melo from Hamilton, Ontario is 2007 Canadian Idol.

Finalists
Brian Melo (born August 15, 1982 in Hamilton, Ontario, 24 years old during the season), is a construction worker from Hamilton, Ontario. He is the only contestant who received a standing ovation from all the judges. He is the Canadian Idol for 2007.
Jaydee Bixby (born August 14, 1990 in Drumheller, Alberta, 17 years old during the season), is a student and performer from Drumheller, Alberta. He was the only member of the season's Top 10 who had never been in the bottom 3 or 2. He is the 2007 runner-up to Canadian Idol, Brian Melo.
Carly Rae Jepsen (born November 21, 1985 in Mission, British Columbia, 21 years old during the season), is a student from Mission, British Columbia. In Season 5, she was the last girl standing.
Dwight d'Eon (born December 18, 1978, 28 years old during the season), is a musician and lobster fisherman from West Pubnico, Nova Scotia.
Matt Rapley (born March 13, 1988, 18 years old during the season), is a student from Regina, Saskatchewan.
Tara Oram (born April 28, 1984, 23 years old during the season), is a singer from Hare Bay, Newfoundland and Labrador. She was never placed in the Bottom 3 or 2 until her night of elimination.
Greg Neufeld (born February 1, 1984, 23 years old during the season), is a singer/songwriter and house framer from Abbotsford, British Columbia. He had made the Top 22 during Season Four, but had been eliminated from the competition in the second week of voting. Regarded as a favorite in Season 5, his elimination caused controversy, in part because of host Ben Mulroney's comment ("Canada got it wrong") upon his elimination.
Martha Joy (born December 8, 1990 in Toronto, Ontario, 16 years old during the season), is a student from Toronto, Ontario.
Khalila Glanville (born July 12, 1983, 23 years old during the season), is a daycare worker from Dorval, Quebec.
Kamila Miller (also known as Mila Miller) (born December 1, 1989, 17 years old during the season), is a student from Woodbridge, Ontario. Despite writing the lyrics to a song on her hands during the final phase of Toronto Week, she was able to impress the judges with her vocal ability.

Finals

Top 10 – #1 Hits

Top 9 – The 60s

Top 8 – Unplugged

Top 7 – Queen

Top 6 – Pop/Rock

Top 5 – My Own Idol

Top 4 – Standards

Top 3 – Judge's Choice & People's Choice

Finale
Each contestant sang three songs.

Song themes
Each week, a song theme will be presented to the competitors. Each competitor must base their song choice on the theme of the week.
 July 17 – #1 Hits
 July 24 – Music of the 1960s
 July 31 – Unplugged (Acoustic music)
 August 7 – Queen
 August 14 – Pop-Rock
 August 21 – My Own Idol (artists who inspire the contestants)
 August 28 – Standards
 September 4 – Judges choice & People choice
 September 11- Season Finale

Help the Idols Build a House
It is a fundraising campaign that will help build the first North American Ronald McDonald Family Retreat at Bear Mountain Resort in Victoria, British Columbia. The sales of the Canadian Idol single, "Believe in You" will be donated to the Ronald McDonald House Charities. Canadian Idol announced on the Season Finale that they raised over $1 Million.

2007 Elimination Chart
Contestants are in reverse chronological order of elimination.

Notes

External links
 Official website
 Top 22 Profiles

2007 Canadian television seasons
5
2007 in Canadian music